Struthiosaurini (derived from Struthiosaurus, "ostrich reptile") is a clade of nodosaurid ankylosaurs from the Cretaceous of Europe and North America. The group is defined as the largest clade containing Struthiosaurus austriacus, but not Nodosaurus textilis or Panoplosaurus mirus, and was named in 2021 by Madzia and colleagues for the relatively stable group found in many previous analyses. Struthiosaurini includes not only the Late Cretaceous European Struthiosaurus, but also the Early Cretaceous European Europelta, the Late Cretaceous European Hungarosaurus, and Stegopelta and Pawpawsaurus from the mid Cretaceous of North America. The approximately equivalent clade Struthiosaurinae, named in 1923 by Franz Nopcsa was previously used to include European nodosaurids, but was never formally named following the PhyloCode, so Madzia et al. named Struthiosaurini instead, as the group of taxa fell within the clade Nodosaurinae, and having the same -inae suffix on both parent and child taxon could be confusing in future. The 2018 phylogenetic analysis of Rivera-Sylva and colleagues was used as the primary reference for Struthiosaurini by Madzia et al., in addition to the supplemental analyses of Arbour et al. (2016), Brown et al. (2017), and Zheng et al. (2018).

References

Nodosaurids
Cretaceous dinosaurs